Joaquín José Marín Ruiz (born 24 September 1989), known as Quini, is a Spanish professional footballer who plays for Granada CF as a right-back or right winger.

Club career
Born in Fernán Núñez, Córdoba, Quini spent his first years as a senior competing in amateur football, as a striker. In the 2011–12 season he made his debut as a professional, appearing and scoring regularly for local Lucena CF in the Segunda División B, now playing as a winger.

Quini joined Real Madrid Castilla of Segunda División on 12 June 2012, penning a two-year contract. He made his league debut on 25 August, playing ten minutes in a 3–2 home win against FC Barcelona B. He was also successfully reconverted as right back by manager Manolo Díaz during the 2013–14 campaign.

On 11 June 2014, Quini signed a three-year deal with La Liga club Rayo Vallecano. He played his first match in the Spanish top flight on 25 August, featuring the full 90 minutes in a 0–0 home draw against Atlético Madrid.

Quini joined Granada CF for three seasons on 28 June 2017, after his contract expired. He contributed 31 appearances and one goal in his second, in a return to the top tier as runners-up.

Quini spent the vast majority of 2019–20 on the sidelines, due to a knee injury.

Career statistics

Club

References

External links

1989 births
Living people
People from Campiña Sur (Córdoba)
Sportspeople from the Province of Córdoba (Spain)
Spanish footballers
Footballers from Andalusia
Association football defenders
Association football wingers
Association football utility players
La Liga players
Segunda División players
Segunda División B players
Tercera División players
Divisiones Regionales de Fútbol players
CD San Roque de Lepe footballers
Antequera CF footballers
Lucena CF players
Real Madrid Castilla footballers
Rayo Vallecano players
Granada CF footballers